In the first edition of the tournament, Goran Ivanišević won the title by defeating Andrei Cherkasov 6–2, 7–6(7–5) in the final.

Seeds

Draw

Finals

Top half

Bottom half

References

External links
 Official results archive (ATP)
 Official results archive (ITF)

1993 Singles
Singles
1993 in Romanian tennis